Clara Azurmendi Moreno (born 4 May 1998) is a Spanish badminton player. She won the bronze medal at the Baku 2015 European Games in the women's singles event. She won her first international title at the 2016 Bulgarian International tournament. Azurmendi competed at the 2020 Tokyo Olympics.

Achievements

European Games 
Women's singles

BWF International Challenge/Series (7 titles, 6 runners-up) 
Women's singles

Women's doubles

  BWF International Challenge tournament
  BWF International Series tournament
  BWF Future Series tournament

References

External links 
 
 
 
 
 

1998 births
Living people
Sportspeople from San Sebastián
Spanish female badminton players
Badminton players at the 2014 Summer Youth Olympics
Badminton players at the 2020 Summer Olympics
Olympic badminton players of Spain
Badminton players at the 2015 European Games
European Games bronze medalists for Spain
European Games medalists in badminton
21st-century Spanish women